Sven Reutter (born 13 August 1996) is a German former professional cyclist, who rode professionally between 2015 and 2018.

Major results

2014
 1st Overall Internationale Niedersachsen-Rundfahrt der Radsport-Junioren
 2nd Time trial, National Junior Road Championships
 7th Time trial, UCI Junior Road World Championships

References

External links

 
 
 

1996 births
Living people
German male cyclists
People from Rottenburg am Neckar
Sportspeople from Tübingen (region)
Cyclists from Baden-Württemberg